Walter Mathews may refer to:

 Walter J. Mathews (1850–1947), American architect
 Walter Mathews (actor) (1926–2012), American character actor

See also
Walter Matthews (disambiguation)